Lake Shirwa is a lake located in Mozambique. It was discovered in 1859 by the Scottish explorer, David Livingstone.

Further reading

References 

Shirwa